Trirhabda flavolimbata is a species of skeletonizing leaf beetle in the family Chrysomelidae. It is found in California along the coast of the San Francisco Bay Area. Its main host plant is coyote bush, but it also feeds on other species of Baccharis, as well as Aster, Senecio, Artemisia, Solidago, and Eriodictyon. It has one brood a season, with larvae active February to March and adults active April to May.

References

Further reading

 
 

Galerucinae
Articles created by Qbugbot
Beetles described in 1843
Taxa named by Carl Gustaf Mannerheim (naturalist)